Shurbolagh-e Olya (also Romanized as Shūrbolāgh-e ‘Olyā) is a village in Chaybasar-e Sharqi Rural District, in the Central District of Poldasht County, West Azerbaijan Province, Iran. At the 2006 census, its population was 449, in 82 families.

References 

Populated places in Poldasht County